Kurosawa Station is the name of multiple train stations in Japan.

Kurosawa Station (Yokote) in Yokote, Akita Prefecture
Kurosawa Station (Yurihonjō, Akita) in Yurihonjō, Akita Prefecture